The 2016–17 Oman Professional League (known as the Omantel Professional League for sponsorship reasons) is the 41st edition of the top football league in Oman. The season will begin on 17 September 2016 and is set to conclude on 12 May 2017. Fanja SC are the defending champions, having won their record ninth title in the previous 2015–16 Oman Professional League season.

Teams
This season the league has 14 teams. Sur SC and Salalah SC were relegated to the Oman First Division League after finishing in the relegation zone in the 2015–16 Oman Professional League season. Al-Musannah SC too failed to secure their spot in the Oman Professional League as they were defeated 3-2 on aggregate in the Relegation/Promotion playoff by Ja'lan SC who had finished third in the 2015–16 Oman First Division League. The three relegated teams were therefore replaced by Oman First Division League winners Al-Rustaq SC, runners-up Oman Club and third position holders Ja'lan SC.

Stadiums and locations

Note: Table lists clubs in alphabetical order.

Personnel and kits

Note: Flags indicate national team as has been defined under FIFA eligibility rules. Players may hold more than one non-FIFA nationality.

Managerial changes

Foreign players
Restricting the number of foreign players strictly to four per team, including a slot for a player from AFC countries. A team could use four foreign players on the field during each game including at least one player from the AFC country.

League table

Results

Clubs season-progress

Relegation playoff

First leg

Second legMirbat won 2–1 on aggregate and got promoted for the 2017–18 season.''

Season statistics

Top scorers

Top Omani Scorers

Hat-tricks

Media coverage

See also

2016 Oman Super Cup

References

External links
Season at soccerway.com

Top level Omani football league seasons
2016–17 in Omani football
Oman